Gayfullinskoye (Ğäyfulla) is a rural locality (a village) in Tavakachevsky Selsoviet, Arkhangelsky District, Bashkortostan, Russia. The population was 31 as of 2010. There are 4 streets.

Geography 
Gayfullinskoye is located 13 km northeast of Arkhangelskoye (the district's administrative centre) by road. Ustye-Bassy is the nearest rural locality.

References 

Rural localities in Arkhangelsky District